The 2020 Davis Cup World Group II was held on 5–6 March 2021 and 17–19 September 2021. The eight highest-ranked winners of the World Group II ties automatically progressed to the 2022 Davis Cup World Group I Play-offs. The four lowest-ranked teams took part in an additional knock-out tie in November 2021, with the two winners progressing to the 2022 Davis Cup World Group I Play-offs and two losers contesting the 2022 Davis Cup World Group II Play-offs. The losing nations from the World Group II ties will compete in the 2022 Davis Cup World Group II Play-offs.

Teams
Twenty-four teams participated in the World Group II, in a series decided on a home and away basis. The seedings are based on the Nations Ranking of 9 March.

These twenty-four teams were:
 12 losing teams from World Group I Play-offs:
 12 winning teams from World Group II Play-offs:

The 12 winning teams from the World Group II played at the World Group I Play-offs, and the 12 losing teams played at the World Group II Play-offs in 2021.

''#: Nations Ranking as of 9 March 2020.

Seeded teams
  (#39)
  (#43)
  (#44)
  (#46)
  (#47)
  (#48)
  (#49)
  (#50)
  (#51)
  (#52)
  (#53)
  (#54)

Unseeded teams
  (#55)
  (#56)
  (#57)
  (#58)
  (#59)
  (#60)
  (#61)
  (#62)
  (#63)
  (#64)
  (#65)
  (#66)

Results summary

China withdrew from its match against Zimbabwe because of the COVID-19 pandemic.
Chinese Taipei withdrew from its match against Morocco because of the COVID-19 pandemic.

World Group II results

Zimbabwe vs. China

Bulgaria vs. Mexico

Switzerland vs. Estonia

Tunisia vs. Dominican Republic

Greece vs. Lithuania

Denmark vs. Thailand

Poland vs. El Salvador

Slovenia vs. Paraguay

Turkey vs. Latvia

South Africa vs. Venezuela

Chinese Taipei vs. Morocco

Barbados vs. Indonesia

Notes

References

External links

World Group